The Interpreter is a 2003 murder mystery novel by Suki Kim. A twenty-nine-year-old Korean American court interpreter,  Suzy Park, is startled to discover during a case that her parents' homicide was not random.

Summary
Korean American Suzy Park works as a court interpreter for the New York City courts. She has had two rocky relationships with married men, worked a series of unsatisfying jobs, and cut ties with her family before her parents were shot in an unsolved double murder. During a court case, she discovers that her parents were not murdered by random violence, as the police had indicated, but instead had been shot by political enemies. The discovery motivates Park to investigate what really happened.

Awards and nomination
 PEN/Beyond Margins Award 
 Gustavus Myers Outstanding Book Award
 Runner-up for the PEN/Hemingway Prize

Translations
Dutch: 
French: 
Korean: 
Japanese:

Sources 
Interview: Suki Kim and the Interpreter

Further reading

2003 American novels
American mystery novels
Interpreter
Novels set in New York City
Interpreting and translation in fiction